Shinoda (written: 篠田) is a Japanese surname. Notable persons with the surname Shinoda include:

, Japanese mayor
, Japanese samurai
, Japanese baseball player
, Japanese Yakuza
 Larry Shinoda (1930 – 1997), American automotive designer
, Japanese idol singer
, Japanese film director
 Masami Shinoda (1958–1992), Japanese alto saxophonist
, Japanese gymnast, singer and sports trainer
 Mike Shinoda (born 1977), American musician
, Japanese actor
, Japanese author
, Japanese ink-painter
, Japanese football player
, Japanese politician

See also 
 Shinoda test for flavonoids

Japanese-language surnames